Up and Vanished is an investigative  documentary-style podcast hosted by Payne Lindsey. The series investigates missing persons cold cases by reviewing old leads, interviewing witnesses and townspeople, and on-site investigation. The show is produced by Tenderfoot TV. The first season premiered on August 7, 2016 and investigated the case of Tara Grinstead, a beauty queen and school teacher who disappeared in Ocilla, Georgia. Season 2 aired in August 2018 and focused on the disappearance of Kristal Reisinger in Crestone, Colorado. The podcast also prompted a television special on Oxygen that premiered on November 18, 2018. The success of Up and Vanished has led to the creation of many other podcasts from Payne Lindsey, such as Atlanta Monster and Radio Rental.

History
In 2016, documentary filmmaker Payne Lindsey of Tenderfoot TV studios began researching the Tara Grinstead cold case as a possibility for a new film. Lindsey became aware of Tara Grinstead's case because of its reputation as the largest case file in Georgia state history, but he also soon discovered that his grandmother's friend was one of the last people to see Tara alive. Inspired by the popular NPR podcast Serial, Lindsey recorded his research in a podcast style format detailing the specifics of the case, as well as interviews with key witnesses. The podcast, Up and Vanished, premiered on Apple Podcasts and the show's website, upandvanished.com, on August 7, 2016. Soon after the podcast's release it made the top charts and began receiving attention and notoriety within the small Ocilla, Georgia community. The podcast is credited with reigniting the discussion on the case after it sat dormant for twelve years. In the statement by the Georgia Bureau of Investigation announcing the arrest of Ryan Alexander Duke in connection to the murder, the GBI's spokesperson thanked the media for keeping the public interested in the case.

In 2018, Up and Vanished began to publish a second season dedicated to the 2016 disappearance of Kristal Reisinger. A young mother, Kristal went missing in Crestone, Colorado during a full moon drum circle. Crestone is considered a spiritual center for new age religion.  While Saguache County Sheriff's Office opened a missing persons case, as time passes, the case has not publicly announced new leads. Developments in 2017 have led the investigators to believe foul play is involved in the likely death of Kristal Reisinger.  In late September 2018, the Reisinger case was handed from Saguache County Sheriff's Office to the Colorado Bureau of Investigation.  While season 2 of Up and Vanished went on an unannounced hiatus late 2019, host Payne Lindsey has stated that he's continued to investigate the case and has been documenting the whole time.

In 2021, Up and Vanished began a third season dedicated to the disappearance of Ashley Loring HeavyRunner.

Episodes

Season 1 (2016-7)

Season 2 (2018)

Reception 
From its first publication, Up and Vanished has been met with mixed reactions. Listeners either supported Lindsey's quest for answers, while some believed he was opening up old wounds. Many also attributed the case being solved to the podcast.

In 2017, the Up and Vanished podcast won a Webby Award in the Podcasts & Digital Audio category for Documentaries.

Adaptations

Television
In 2018, true crime network Oxygen announced that they would premiere a television special based on the podcast. At just over an hour long, this television special focused on investigating the crime and the two parties that confessed to the crime. Lindsey and his team set out to interview people in the community, which included Tara Grinstead's friends and people in law enforcement. The show mixed actual photos and videos from the investigation and dramatized reenactments to tell the story that the podcast did. A great deal of the show was dedicated to investigating Bo Dukes and Ryan Duke.

On January 9, 2020, it was announced that the series would premiere on February 15, 2020.

See also
Tara Grinstead murder case
List of American crime podcasts

References

External links 
 

2016 podcast debuts
Audio podcasts
Crime podcasts
Infotainment
Investigative journalism
Podcasts adapted into television shows
2018 podcast endings
American podcasts
Documentary podcasts